"Rain, Rain, Go Away" is a popular English language nursery rhyme. It has a Roud Folk Song Index number of 19096.

Lyrics
There are few versions and variations of this rhyming couplet. The most common modern version is:

Rain, rain, go away,
Come again another day.

Origins
Similar rhymes can be found in many societies, including ancient Greece and ancient Rome. The modern English language rhyme can be dated to at least to the 17th century when James Howell in his collection of proverbs noted:

Rain rain go to Spain: fair weather come again.

A version very similar to the modern version was noted by John Aubrey in 1687 as used by "little children" to "charm away the Rain...":

Rain Rain go away,
Come again on Saturday.

A wide variety of alternatives have been recorded including: "Midsummer day", "washing day", "Christmas Day" and "Martha's wedding day".

In the mid-19th century James Orchard Halliwell collected and published the version:

Rain, rain, go away
Come again another day
Little Arthur wants to play.

In a book from the late 19th century, the lyrics are as follows:
Rain, Rain,
Go away;
Come again,
April day;
Little Johnny wants to play.

Notes

Songs about weather
English children's songs
English nursery rhymes
English folk songs
Traditional children's songs